Virgil Soeroredjo (born 11 March 1985) is a former Surinamese badminton player and now coach. He competed for Suriname at the 2012 Summer Olympics. He also competed for Suriname at 3 Pan Am Games: the 2003 Pan American Games, the 2007 Pan American Games & the 2011 Pan American Games. As a young badminton player of the club SCVU in Suriname Virgil Soeroredjo won numerous juniors titles and was soon selected to represent his country abroad winning several juniors medals at Caribbean, Central American and South American events. Much of his success was with his doubles partner Mitchel Wongsodikromo.

Multiple Caribbean and Pan Am Juniors badminton champion
Together they grew up to become a badminton force for Suriname in the Pan Am region. In 2000 they won the Pan Am Boys Doubles U-17 juniors title at Cuba after they had already won the Caribbean Boys Doubles titles U-17 & U-19 the same year at Barbados. At the 2000 Carebaco Games Virgil Soeroredjo won five Gold Medals and a Silver Medal. Winning the triple in the U-17 category plus Boys Doubles in the U-19 category and the U-19 team event for Suriname and a second place in Mixed Doubles U-19. In 2001 Virgil Soeroredjo managed to successfully defend four of his five Carebaco juniors titles only losing his singles U-17 title in the final at Jamaica. In 2001 Virgil & Mitchel won Boys Doubles U-17 Gold at the South American Juniors Championships in Rio de Janeiro, Brazil. That year they also won the Regatas Cup for Boys Doubles U-17 in Lima, Peru. In 2002 Virgil Soeroredjo & Mitchel Wongsodikromo became Pan American Juniors Semi-Champions U-19 in Orange County, USA. At the same event Virgil Soeroredjo also took two Bronze Medals, one in the U-19 Mixed Doubles category and also in the team event, where the Surinamese juniors team surprisingly beat favorites Canada. In the 2002 Carebaco Games Virgil Soeroredjo won Gold at the Men's Singles and the Men's Doubles U-19 juniors categories at Puerto Rico. Together with compatriot Carolyn Davids he participated at the Pan American IBF World Academy training camp held in Lima, Peru 2002. In the 2003 Carebaco Games at Trinidad & Tobago Virgil Soeroredjo lost both the U-19 Boys Singles & Mixed Doubles finals to his compatriot Mitchel Wongsodikromo. Together they eventually won the Boys Doubles U-19 title and the Carebaco Juniors 2003 team event.

International and national achievements
In 2002 they both won a Men's Singles Bronze medal at the 2002 Central American and Caribbean Games (CACSO Games 2002) in San Salvador. At that time a special achievement since they were both still 17-year-old juniors. In 2003 Virgil Soeroredjo was part of the first Surinamese badminton team that participated at the Sudirman Cup Mixed teams World Championships in Eindhoven, the Netherlands. In 2005 at the Carebaco Open Championships Virgil Soeroredjo managed to get in the semi-finals Men's Singles achieving a Bronze Medal as well as in the Team Event held in Cuba.

Virgil Soeroredjo gained six National Men's Singles titles in 2004, 2006, 2008, 2011, 2013 & 2014. Internationally he was a triple champion at the Suriname International in 2008 winning all three categories Men's Singles, Men's Doubles and Mixed Doubles. In 2009 he won the Men's Singles and Men's Doubles titles at the Suriname International, in 2010 he won the Mixed Doubles title and in 2011 he won the Men's Doubles title at the Suriname International. 
In 2010 Virgil Soeroredjo & Mitchel Wongsodikromo reached the final at the Bill Graham Miami International and in 2011 they reached the semi-final of that same event. In 2011 Virgil Soeroredjo won both the Suriname International and the Carebaco International in Men's Doubles. In March 2010 Virgil Soeroredjo was also part of the Suriname badminton team that won a Bronze medal Mixed Teams Badminton at the 2010 South American Games in Medellín. In July 2010 Virgil Soeroredjo & Mitchel Wongsodikromo won the only medal, a Bronze, for Suriname at the 2010 Central American and Caribbean Games by reaching the semi-finales. In 2012 Virgil Soeroredjo was part of the first Suriname Men's badminton team that participated at the Thomas Cup preliminaries in Los Angeles, USA.

In 2009 Virgil Soeroredjo moved to the Netherlands to improve his skills, training under coach Mike van Daal. He participated at the highest badminton club competition level (Eredivisie) for BC Culemborg and BV van Zijderveld. At that time this badminton player started switching his focus on his sports management study at the Johan Cruyff University in Amsterdam.
From 2012 the National Association, Surinaamse Badminton Bond was annually organizing a Top 8 Singles event in honor of Virgil Soeroredjo's participation at the 2012 London Olympics. In 2013 Virgil Soeroredjo was planning on attending this event in his home country held by the badminton club of Nieuw Stenov, unfortunately he did not due to his busy study schedule.
In November 2013 Virgil attended the National Championships and 7th Suriname International in Paramaribo. In April 2014 he won the 3rd Assuria International Easter Badminton Tournament 2014 in Paramaribo beating young Jamaican talent Samuel Ricketts in the final. In November 2014 Virgil attended the National Championships and 8th Suriname International in Paramaribo. Due to a recurring knee injury Virgil decided to retire as an international player in December 2015.  He then followed the BWF Level 1 and Level 2 Badminton Coaches courses successfully.

National badminton titles

1999 - National Championships : Men's Doubles Silver 
2000 - National Championships : Men's Singles Silver, Men's Doubles Silver & Mixed Doubles Gold
2001 - National Championships : Men's Doubles Gold, 
2002 - National Championships : No National Championships held that year 
2003 - National Championships : Men's Singles Silver
2004 - National Championships : Men's Singles Gold & Mixed Doubles Silver
2005 - National Championships : Men's Singles Silver, Men's Doubles Gold & Mixed Doubles Silver
2006 - National Championships : Men's Singles Gold, Men's Doubles Gold & Mixed Doubles Gold
2007 - National Championships : No National Championships held that year 
2008 - National Championships : Men's Singles Gold, Men's Doubles Gold & Mixed Doubles Silver
2009 - National Championships : Virgil Soeroredjo did not participate that year 
2010 - National Championships : Virgil Soeroredjo did not participate that year 
2011 - National Championships : Men's Singles Gold, Men's Doubles Gold & Mixed Doubles Gold
2012 - National Championships : Virgil Soeroredjo did not participate that year
2013 - National Championships : Men's Singles Gold, Men's Doubles Gold & Mixed Doubles Silver
2014 - National Championships : Men's Singles Gold, Men's Doubles Silver

International badminton titles

1999 - Caribbean Easter Tournament Curaçao : Boys Singles U-15 Silver, Boys Doubles U-15 Gold, Boys Doubles U-19 Bronze & Mixed Doubles U-15 Bronze 
1999 - Carebaco Juniors Championships : Boys Doubles U-19 Bronze, Team Event U-19 Gold
2000 - South American Juniors Championships : Boys Singles U-15 Silver, Boys Doubles U-15 Silver
2000 - Caribbean Easter Tournament Curaçao : Boys Singles U-15 Silver, Boys Doubles U-15 Gold, Mixed Doubles U-15 Bronze & Boys Doubles U-19 Bronze
2000 - Carebaco Juniors Championships : Boys Singles U-17 Gold, Boys Doubles U-17 Gold & Mixed Doubles U-17 Gold, Mixed Doubles U-19 Silver, Team Event U-19 Gold
2000 - Pan Am Juniors Championships   : Boys Doubles U-17 Gold, Mixed Doubles U-17 Silver
2001 - Carebaco Juniors Championships : Boys Singles U-17 Silver, Boys Doubles & Mixed Doubles U-17 Gold, Mixed Doubles U-19 Gold & Team Event U-19 Gold
2001 - Regatas Peru Juniors Open      : Boys Singles U-17 Bronze, Boys Doubles U-17 Gold, Mixed Doubles U-17 Bronze
2002 - Carebaco Juniors Championships : Boys Singles U-19 Gold & Boys Doubles U-19 Gold
2002 - Pan Am Juniors Championships   : Boys Doubles U-19 Silver, Mixed Doubles U-19 Bronze & Team Event U-19 Bronze
2002 - CACSO Games El Salvador        : Men's Singles Bronze Medal
2003 - 2003 PAN AM Games Santo Domingo: Participation
2003 - Carebaco Juniors Championships : Boys Singles U-19 Silver, Boys Doubles U-19 Gold, Mixed Doubles U-19 Silver, Team Event U-19 Gold, Team Event Seniors Bronze 
2003 - Sudirman Cup World Championship: 1st Participation Surinamese Mixed Team 
2005 - Carebaco International Open Championships    : Men's Singles Bronze 
2006 - BC70 Veluwe Open Tournament Vaassen, NL: Men's Singles Gold & Men's Doubles Gold
2006 - BC Weesp Tournament, NL        : Men's Singles Bronze & Men's Doubles Bronze
2007 - Carebaco International Open Championships    : Men's Doubles Bronze 
2007 - Racketeers Tournament Jamaica  : Men's Singles A Silver & Men's Doubles A Silver
2007 - 2007 PAN AM Games Rio de Janeiro: Participation
2008 - 2nd Suriname International     : Men's Singles Gold, Men's Doubles Gold & Mixed Doubles Gold 
2009 - BC70 Veluwe Dauwtrappers Tournament Vaassen, NL: Men's Singles Gold
2009 - BC70 Veluwe Open Tournament Vaassen, NL: Men's Singles Gold
2009 - Open Alphense Tournament, NL   : Men's Singles Gold
2009 - 3rd Suriname International     : Men's Singles Gold & Men's Doubles Gold 
2010 - AMOR Tournament Groningen, NL  : Men's Singles Silver
2010 - CACSO Games Mayaguez           : Men's Doubles Bronze Medal
2010 - SOUTH AMERICAN GAMES Medellin : Team Event Bronze 
2010 - Bill Graham Miami International: Men's Doubles Silver 
2010 - 4th Suriname International     : Men's Doubles Silver & Mixed Doubles Gold 
2011 - Carebaco International Open Championships    : Men's Doubles Gold 
2011 - 2011 PAN AM Games Guadelajara  : Participation
2011 - Bill Graham Miami International: Men's Doubles Bronze 
2011 - 5th Suriname International     : Men's Doubles Gold 
2012 - Thomas Cup Pan Am preliminaries: 1st Participation Surinamese Men's Team
2012 - 2012 London OLYMPIC GAMES      : 2nd Surinamese Badminton Player to participate at the Olympic Games after Oscar Brandon
2013 - 7th Suriname International     : Men's Doubles Bronze
2014 - Carlton GT1 Master toernooi Almere 2014, NL      : Men's Singles Bronze 
2014 - 3rd Assuria International Easter Badminton Tournament 2014, SUR     : Men's Singles Gold 
2014 - Phytalis Drop Shot Grand Prix Toernooi 2014, NL      : Men's Singles Bronze 
2014 - 8th Suriname International     : Men's Singles Bronze

Achievements with results

Central American and Caribbean Games 
Men's singles

Men's doubles

BWF International Series/ Future Series

Men's singles

Men's doubles

Mixed doubles

 BWF International Challenge tournament
 BWF International Series tournament
 BWF Future Series tournament

Personal life
Virgil Soeroredjo and his wife Willeke have one daughter. Virgil Soeroredjo graduated in 2018 as sports marketeer from the Johan Cruijff University in the Netherlands and was trainer/coach at the Dutch premier division club The Flying Shuttle Barendrecht in the 2018/2019 season.

References

External links
 
 
 

1985 births
Living people
Sportspeople from Paramaribo
Surinamese people of Javanese descent
Surinamese male badminton players
Badminton players at the 2012 Summer Olympics
Olympic badminton players of Suriname
Badminton players at the 2003 Pan American Games
Badminton players at the 2007 Pan American Games
Badminton players at the 2011 Pan American Games
Pan American Games competitors for Suriname
Competitors at the 2002 Central American and Caribbean Games
Competitors at the 2006 Central American and Caribbean Games
Competitors at the 2010 Central American and Caribbean Games
Central American and Caribbean Games bronze medalists for Suriname
South American Games bronze medalists for Suriname
South American Games medalists in badminton
Competitors at the 2010 South American Games
Central American and Caribbean Games medalists in badminton